Pursley's Ferry Historic District is a  historic district located along Old River Road near Church Road by the Delaware River in Holland Township, Hunterdon County, New Jersey. It was added to the National Register of Historic Places on October 8, 1980 for its significance in architecture, commerce, and transportation. The district includes 4 contributing buildings.

History
Pursley's Ferry, also spelled Parsley, is located south of the mouth of the Musconetcong River. Starting sometime after 1742, the ferry went across the Delaware River to transport goods to and from the Durham Mill and Furnace in Pennsylvania. The Purcell/Brinks House was the tavern at the crossing managed by Thomas Pursell and later by Daniel Brinks. The building of the Delaware Canal, Delaware and Raritan Canal and Belvidere Delaware Railroad during the early 19th century ended the need for the ferry.

Description
The Hart Johnson House is a late 18th century two and one-half story brick farmhouse built with Federal style and featuring Flemish bond.

Gallery

References

External links
 

Holland Township, New Jersey
National Register of Historic Places in Hunterdon County, New Jersey
Historic districts on the National Register of Historic Places in New Jersey
New Jersey Register of Historic Places
Federal architecture in New Jersey